Joseph Ellis Jr. (1697-1783) represented Dedham, Massachusetts in the Great and General Court.

He was born in 1697 to Joseph Ellis in Dedham and died there in 1783. He served in the Massachusetts House of Representatives in 1741, 1751, 1758, and 1759. He was a deacon of the First Church and Parish in Dedham from 1735 to 1783. In 1742 and 1743 he was a selectman, and from 1743 to 1753 he was the town treasurer.

He married Judith Lewis in 1714, Susanna Smith in 1747, and Mercy (Tufts) Bradshaw in 1756. He had at least four children. He had a large deal of property at his death.

References

Works cited

1697 births
1783 deaths
Dedham, Massachusetts selectmen
Members of the colonial Massachusetts General Court from Dedham
Deacons at First Church and Parish in Dedham